Sonata for Solo Cello may refer to:

 Sonata for Solo Cello (Crumb)
 Sonata for Solo Cello (Kodály)
 Sonata for Solo Cello (Ligeti)